Vanuatu Red Cross Society  was founded in 1992. It has its headquarters in Port Vila.

External links
Official website

Red Cross and Red Crescent national societies
Organizations established in 1992
1992 establishments in Vanuatu
Medical and health organisations based in Vanuatu